The Bowie City Police Department (BPD) is the primary law enforcement agency for Bowie, Maryland, servicing a population of 54,884 (2004 census estimate) in  of the municipality.

Overview
The City of Bowie Police Department was established on September 11, 2006 under the direction of then Police Chief Katherine Perez and Deputy Police Chief John K. Nesky. Currently the Bowie Police department is under the leadership of Police Chief John K. Nesky and Deputy Police Chief Dwayne Preston. The Bowie Police Department is located in Prince George's County and is among the largest municipalities within the State of Maryland. As of today, the agency has a total of 65 sworn police officers. The Bowie Police Department also currently employs 21 civilian personnel. The City of Bowie Police Department covers approximately 18 square miles, protecting approximately 60,000 residents. The police department consists of several sections and divisions which include the following: patrol division, community services section, criminal investigations section, directed response team, canine unit, training section, administrative support section, records section, evidence processing section, and most recently added its own communications and dispatch division.

References

External links
City of Bowie government website
Bowie Police Department weblink

 List of law enforcement agencies in Maryland

Bowie, Maryland
Bowie
2006 establishments in Maryland